The Moving Sidewalks were an American four-person psychedelic blues rock band formed in 1966 from Houston, Texas. They released several singles and an album, before bassist Don Summers and keyboardist Tom Moore were drafted into the army, bringing the band to an end. Guitarist Billy Gibbons and drummer Dan Mitchell then formed band ZZ Top.

History
Gibbons founded the Moving Sidewalks in the mid-1960s and they quickly drew a large following, especially among the Houston "teen scene".  They recorded several singles and one full-length album, Flash. Their single "99th Floor" was well received, and topped the charts at No. 1 in Houston for six weeks. The success of this record led them to sign with Wand Records, which then released "Need Me", also a Top 10 hit for the band. The group was asked to open for many rock tours, including Jimi Hendrix and the Doors.

After Tom Moore and Don Summers were drafted into the United States Army, Gibbons and Mitchell added Lanier Greig and formed the original ZZ Top.

While attending Warner Brothers' art school in Hollywood, California, Gibbons engaged with his first bands including the Saints, Billy G & the Blueflames, and the Coachmen. By 1967, Gibbons returned to Houston and formed an artfully designed band, conceptually inspired by friend and fellow musician Roky Erickson and the 13th Floor Elevators. 'The Moving Sidewalks' name was chosen, and shortly thereafter they recorded "99th Floor". Around this time Gibbons developed a camaraderie with Jimi Hendrix.  As a guest on The Dick Cavett Show, Hendrix deflected the implication that he was the greatest guitarist. He did not say who the greatest guitarist was, but a myth has circulated that Hendrix considered Gibbons the best, and stated so in an interview, but no such interview has ever been located.

The Moving Sidewalks continued to appear along with the 13th Floor Elevators at the short-lived yet Houston psychedelic venue, Love Street Light Circus, at Allen's Landing. One night the Elevators set was cut short by Houston Police, who arrested the band's lead singer Erickson for marijuana possession.

In January 2013, Gibbons announced the Moving Sidewalks would reunite with all original members for one show on March 30, 2013, at B.B. King's Blues Club in New York City.  Since that successful sold out show and despite their single show announcement, the band played as official headliners of Austin Psych Fest on May 1, 2013, and the Charity Gala for The Deacons of Deadwood Ball on September 28, 2013, in Houston.

Discography

Albums
Flash (1969) Tantara TS 6919. The original release. Produced by manager Steve Ames.
99th Floor (1982) Eva 12002. Reissue of the Tantara album plus the five tracks that were issued on singles only.
Flash (2000) Akarma AK 117. Another reissue of the Tantara album with the five singles tracks.
The Pre-ZZ Houston Roots (2004) Lone Star LSR 19629. A compilation of material by the Moving Sidewalks, including six unreleased tracks; 21 songs total.
The Roots Of ZZ Top (2010) Fuel 61820. A compilation of seven Moving Sidewalks songs, four Warlocks songs, seven American Blues songs; all tracks previously released on various singles and albums.
The Complete Collection (2012) Rockbeat ROC 3018. A compilation of material by the Moving Sidewalks, including six unreleased tracks; also includes demo material by Billy Gibbons' first band, the Coachmen; 26 songs total.

EPs
The Moving Sidewalks - A Band From Texas (1968) Another Mangy Mutt 1030. This 7-inch EP was released on the indie label MUTT, a subsidiary of the Moxie Record Company. It is a mono recording and the playback speed is at 45rpm. This record is a combination/compilation of the band's A & B sides from their first two singles for Wand Records.
 Side A: 99th Floor; What Are You Going To Do
 Side B: Every Night A New Surprise; Need Me

Singles
"99th Floor" / "What Are You Going To Do" (1967) Tantara 3101; reissued as Wand 1156
"Need Me" / "Every Night A New Surprise" (1967) Wand 1167
"I Want To Hold Your Hand" / "Joe Blues" (1968) Tantara 3108
"Flashback" (4:15 - radio edit) / "No Good To Cry" (3:08 - radio edit) (1969) Tantara 3113

References

External links
 Official Moving Sidewalks Website

American blues rock musical groups
Musical groups from Houston
Psychedelic rock music groups from Texas
Wand Records artists